Botho University (formerly known as Botho College/NIIT) is Botswana's largest private tertiary educational provider, founded in 1997. The college offers certificates, diplomas and graduate degrees in accountancy and computer science. It is the first private tertiary institution in the country to be accredited by the Tertiary Education Council (TEC). All of its programs are also accredited by the Botswana Qualification Authority (BQA). It has trained 16,000 graduates, and enrolls 4,000 students, supported by 150 academic staff.

Botho's Computing Science programs are partnered with international institutions such as NIIT, Open University and Teesside University.

Extra-curricular activities

Botho University Linkz ICT Challenge 
In 2009, Botho College launched an ICT-based competition called LINKZ The ICT Challenge, which brings together the best ICT students in the country. For this competition Botho University launched a page on their website.  It tests students' knowledge in the field of company technology. In 2009, Linkz ICT Challenge brought together more than 300 young people from tertiary institutions including University of Botswana, Gaborone Institute of Professional Studies, Ba Isago College, ABM University, and Limkowing University of Creative Technology.

See also
 University of Botswana

References

External links 

 http://repository.bothouniversity.ac.bw/buir/
 Botho University celebrates 25 years of existence :: Mmegi Online
 Botho University launches sustainable growth strategy :: Mmegi Online

Educational institutions established in 1997
Schools in Botswana
1997 establishments in Botswana